Josef Herzig (25 September 1853 – 4 July 1924) was an Austrian chemist.  

Herzig was born in Sanok, Galicia, which at that time was part of Austria-Hungary. Herzig went to school in Breslau until 1874, started studying chemistry at the University of Vienna but joined August Wilhelm von Hofmann at the University of Berlin in the second semester. He worked with Robert Bunsen at the University of Heidelberg and received his PhD for work with Ludwig Barth at the  University of Vienna. He later became lecturer and, in 1897, professor at the University of Vienna. He died in Vienna in 1924.

Work
Herzig was active in the chemistry of natural products. He succeeded in determining the structure of flavonoids quercetin,  fisetin and rhamnetin as well as several alkaloids.

References 
 
 

Austrian chemists
Jews from Galicia (Eastern Europe)
People from Sanok
1853 births
1924 deaths